Foster's Home for Imaginary Friends is an American animated television series created by Craig McCracken for Cartoon Network Studios. The series centers on a boy named Mac, who is pressured by his mother to abandon his imaginary friend Bloo, who moves into an orphanage for imaginary friends, and is kept from adoption so that Mac can visit him daily. The episodes center on the day-to-day adventures and predicaments in which Mac, Bloo and other characters get involved.

The series premiered on August 13, 2004, with the 90-minute pilot episode "House of Bloo's", and concluded on May 3, 2009, with the episode "Goodbye to Bloo". The series ran for 6 seasons consisting of 13 episodes apiece. Animated shorts aired from 2006–2007.

Series overview

Episodes
Note: All episodes were directed by series creator Craig McCracken, with the only co-direction of Rob Renzetti in "Destination: Imagination".

Season 1 (2004)

Season 2 (2005)
Even though season 2 aired from early-mid 2005, the first five episodes of this season were produced in late 2004 (according to the credits).

Season 3 (2005–06)

Season 4 (2006)

Shorts (2006–07)

Season 5 (2007–08)

Season 6 (2008–09)

Home media releases

Notes

References

External links 
 
 List of 
 List of 

Lists of American children's animated television series episodes
Lists of Cartoon Network television series episodes
Episodes